Rhapis is a genus of about 10 species of small palms native to southeastern Asia from southern Japan and southern China south to Sumatra. The species are commonly known as lady palms. 
They are fan palms (subfamily Coryphoideae), with the leaves with a bare petiole terminating in a rounded fan of numerous leaflets. The plants have thin stems growing to 3–4 m tall, branching at the base, forming clumps and are dioecious, with male and female flowers produced on separate plants.

Cultivation and uses

Several species are cultivated as ornamental plants, of which Rhapis excelsa is the most common. Rhapis excelsa and some other species are relatively cold tolerant and can be grown outdoors in subtropical or warm temperate climates. Rhapis excelsa was listed by NASA as one of the best plants for removing toxins from the air.

References

 
Arecaceae genera
Dioecious plants